The 1922 Arkansas gubernatorial election was held on October 3, 1922.

Incumbent Democratic Governor Thomas Chipman McRae won re-election to a second term, defeating Republican nominee John W. Grabiel with 78.09% of the vote.

Democratic primary
The Democratic primary election was held on August 8, 1922.

Candidates
Thomas Chipman McRae, incumbent Governor
E. Pink Tony, judge

Results

General election

Candidates
Thomas Chipman McRae, Democratic
John W. Grabiel, Republican, lawyer

Results

Notes

References

Bibliography
 
 

1922
Arkansas
Gubernatorial